Xiaojun Chen is a Chinese applied mathematician, Chair Professor of Applied Mathematics at Hong Kong Polytechnic University. Her research interests include nonsmooth and nonconvex optimization, complementarity theory, and stochastic equilibrium problems.

Education and career
Chen completed her Ph.D. in 1987 at Xi'an Jiaotong University. At Hong Kong Polytechnic University, she was head of the applied mathematics department from 2013 to 2019. Since 2020 she has directed the University Research Facility in Big Data Analytics, and co-directed the CAS AMSS-PolyU Joint Laboratory of Applied Mathematics

Recognition
Chen was named a SIAM Fellow in the 2021 class of fellows, "for contributions to optimization, stochastic variational inequalities, and nonsmooth analysis". She was named to the 2023 class of Fellows of the American Mathematical Society, "for contributions to mathematical optimization, stochastic variational inequalities, and the analysis of nondifferentiable functions".

References

External links

Year of birth missing (living people)
Living people
Chinese mathematicians
Chinese women mathematicians
Xi'an Jiaotong University alumni
Academic staff of Hong Kong Polytechnic University
Fellows of the Society for Industrial and Applied Mathematics
Fellows of the American Mathematical Society